The 2009 Zagreb Open was a professional tennis tournament played on outdoor red clay courts. It was part of the 2009 ATP Challenger Tour. It took place in Zagreb, Croatia between May 11 and May 17, 2009.

Singles entrants

Seeds

 Rankings are as of May 4, 2009.

Other entrants
The following players received wildcards into the singles main draw:
  Ivan Dodig
  Nikola Mektić
  Antonio Sančić
  Antonio Veić

The following players received entry from the qualifying draw:
  Andrea Arnaboldi
  Evgeny Donskoy
  Martin Fischer
  Franko Škugor

Champions

Singles

 Marcos Daniel def.  Olivier Rochus, 6–3, 6–4

Doubles

 Peter Luczak /  Alessandro Motti def.  Brendan Evans /  Ryan Sweeting, 6–4, 6–4

External links
Official website
ITF search

Zagreb Open
Zagreb Open
2009 in Croatian tennis